Yutmaru Sar is a mountain in the Hispar mountain range, a subrange of the Karakoram. At an elevation of  it is the 88th highest mountain in the world. Yutmaru Sar is located in the Gilgit-Baltistan region of Pakistan-administered Kashmir. It was first climbed in 1980.

References

Seven-thousanders of the Karakoram
Mountains of Gilgit-Baltistan